Nudeswirl is the second full-length album and first major label release by American rock band Nudeswirl. It was released in 1993 on Megaforce Records. Two songs from the album, "F Sharp" and "Buffalo," were released as singles.

Reception
In 2005 the album was placed number 427 on Rock Hard magazine's list of "The 500 Greatest Rock & Metal Albums of All Time". Staff writer Alex Henderson of Allmusic gave the album four out of five stars, writing "the New Jersey residents put their own spin on Seattle's grunge sound, and the interesting effects and atmospherics they weave into rockers like 'Now Nothing,' 'Buffalo,' and 'Damned' point to the fact that Nudeswirl was intent on being recognizable and distinctive."

Track listing
 "Gordon's Corner" – 5:52 
 "F Sharp" – 3:36 
 "Sooner or Later" – 5:09
 "Disappear" – 5:10
 "Buffalo" – 4:36
 "Potato Trip" – 3:31
 "Dog Food" – 4:04
 "When I'm Dead" – 3:26
 "Now Nothing" – 5:25
 "Three" – 5:51
 "Damned" - 4:37
 "Ringworm" – 5:10

Personnel

Nudeswirl
Diz Cortright - guitar
Shane M. Green - vocals, guitar
Woody Newland - drums
Christopher Wargo - bass guitar

Production
Produced by Nudeswirl
Engineered by Eric Rachel
Mixed by Eric Rachel and Nudeswirl
Mastered by Howie Weinberg
Digital editing by Alan Douches
Artwork by Wayne Turback

References

External links

1993 albums
Nudeswirl albums